BBC Radio is an operational business division and service of the British Broadcasting Corporation (which has operated in the United Kingdom under the terms of a royal charter since 1927). The service provides national radio stations covering the majority of musical genres, as well as local radio stations covering local news, affairs and interests. It also oversees online audio content.

Of the national radio stations, BBC Radio 1, 2, 3, 4 and 5 Live are all available through analogue radio (AM or FM (with BBC Radio 4 LW on longwave) as well as on DAB Digital Radio and BBC Sounds. The Asian Network broadcasts on DAB and selected AM frequencies in the English Midlands. BBC Radio 1Xtra, 4 Extra, 5 Sports Extra, 6 Music and the World Service broadcast only on DAB and BBC Sounds, while Radio 1 Dance and Relax streams are available only online.

All of the BBC's national radio stations broadcast from bases in London and Manchester, usually in or near to Broadcasting House or MediaCityUK. However, the BBC's network production units located in Belfast, Birmingham, Bristol, Cardiff and Glasgow also make radio programmes.

History

The BBC's radio services began in 1922. The British Government licensed the BBC through its General Post Office, which had original control of the airwaves because they had been interpreted under law as an extension of the Post Office services. Today radio broadcasting still makes up a large part of the corporation's output – the title of the BBC's listings magazine, Radio Times, reflects this.

First charter

On 1 January 1927, the British Broadcasting Company was succeeded in monopoly control of the airwaves by the British Broadcasting Corporation, under the terms of a royal charter.

John Reith, who had been the founding managing director of the commercial company, became the first Director-General. He expounded firm principles of centralised, all-encompassing radio broadcasting, stressing programming standards and moral tone. These he set out in his 1924 autobiography, Broadcast Over Britain, influencing modern ideas of public service broadcasting in the United Kingdom. To this day, the BBC aims to follow the Reithian directive to "inform, educate and entertain".

Competition from overseas stations

Although no other broadcasting organisation was licensed in the UK until 1973, commercial competition soon opened up from overseas. The English language service of Radio Luxembourg began in 1933 as one of the earliest commercial radio stations broadcasting to Britain and Ireland. With no possibility of domestic commercial broadcasting in the UK, a former British Royal Air Force captain and entrepreneur (and from 1935 Conservative Party MP) named Leonard Plugge set up his own International Broadcasting Company in 1931. The IBC began leasing time on transmitters in continental Europe and then reselling it as sponsored English-language programming aimed at audiences in Britain and Ireland. Because Plugge successfully demonstrated that state monopolies such as that of the BBC could be broken, other parties became attracted to the idea of creating a new commercial radio station specifically for this purpose. It was an important forerunner of pirate radio and modern commercial radio in the United Kingdom. The onset of World War II silenced all but one of the original IBC stations, with only Radio Luxembourg continuing its nightly transmissions to Britain.

Empire and the world

To provide a different service from the domestic audience the Corporation started the BBC Empire Service on short wave in 1932, originally in English but it soon provided programmes in other languages. At the start of the Second World War it was renamed The Overseas Service and is now known as the BBC World Service.

Commercial radio influence

Beginning in March 1964, Radio Caroline became the first of what would become ten offshore pirate radio stations that began to ring the British coastline, mostly along the south-east coast. By 1966 millions were tuning into these commercial stations, and the BBC was rapidly losing its radio listening audience. This was largely due to the fact that even though they were fully aware of the problem, the BBC still only played a few hours of pop music records a week, as opposed to the pirates which broadcast chart music and new releases every day.

The British government reacted by passing the Marine Offences Act, which virtually wiped out all of the pirate stations at midnight on 14 August 1967, by banning any British citizen from working for a pirate station. Only Radio Caroline survived, and continues to broadcast today, though the last original offshore broadcast was in 1989.

One of the stations, Radio London (also known as "Big L"), was so successful that the BBC was told to copy it as best they could. This led to a complete overhaul by Frank Gillard, the BBC's director of radio output, creating the four analogue channels that still form the basis of its broadcasting today. The creator of Radio 1 told the press that his family had been fans of Radio London.

The BBC hired many out-of-work broadcasting staff who had come from the former offshore stations. Kenny Everett was asked for input in how to run the new pop station due to his popularity with both listeners and fellow presenters. Tony Blackburn, who presented the very first Radio 1 Breakfast show, had previously presented the morning show on Radio Caroline and later on Radio London. He attempted to duplicate the same sound for Radio 1. Among the other DJs hired was John Peel, who had presented the overnight show on Radio London, called The Perfumed Garden. Though it only ran for a few months prior to Radio London's closure, The Perfumed Garden got more fan mail than the rest of the pop DJs on Radio London combined, so much that staff wondered what to do with it all. The reason it got so much mail was that it played different music and was the beginning of the "album rock" genre. On Everett's suggestion, Radio London's PAMS jingles were commissioned to be re-recorded in Dallas, Texas, so that "Wonderful Radio London" became "Wonderful Radio One on BBC".

The BBC's more popular stations have encountered pressure from the commercial sector. John Myers, who had developed commercial brands such as Century Radio and Real Radio, was asked in the first quarter of 2011 to conduct a review into the efficiencies of Radios 1, 2, 1Xtra and 6 Music. His role, according to Andrew Harrison, the chief executive of RadioCentre, was "to identify both areas of best practice and possible savings."

BBC analogue networks
On 30 September 1967:
BBC Radio 1 was launched as a pop music station, initially on a part-time basis.
The BBC Light Programme (launched 29 July 1945) was renamed BBC Radio 2 and broadcast easy listening music, folk, jazz, light entertainment and sport. 
The evening BBC Third Programme (launched 29 September 1946) and daytime BBC Music Programme (launched 22 March 1965) were merged under the heading of BBC Radio 3, although the Third Programme kept its separate title until 3 April 1970.
The BBC Home Service (launched 1 September 1939) became BBC Radio 4.
BBC Radio 5 was launched on 27 August 1990 as a home for sport and educational and children's programming, but was replaced by BBC Radio 5 Live, a dedicated news and sport network, on 28 March 1994.

2002 digital radio networks
With the increased rollout of Digital Audio Broadcasting (DAB) between 1995 and 2002, BBC Radio launched several new digital-only stations BBC 1Xtra, BBC 6 Music and BBC 7 in 2002 on 16 August, 11 March and 15 December respectively – the first for "new black British music", the second as a source of performance-based "alternative" music, the latter specialising in archive classic comedy shows, drama and children's programmes. BBC Asian Network joined the national DAB network on 28 October 2002. The stations had "Radio" added to their names in 2008. In 2011, BBC Radio 7 was renamed BBC Radio 4 Extra and the service was more closely aligned with Radio 4.

Stations

National (UK-wide)
The BBC today runs national domestic radio stations, six of which are available in analogue formats (via FM or AM), while other have a purely digital format – they can be received via DAB Digital Radio, UK digital television (satellite, cable and Freeview) plus live streams and listen again on BBC Sounds. The current stations are:

BBC Radio 1 – youth-orientated music, including talk, comedy and alternative music, plus news, original in-house live music sessions, original live music concerts and music documentaries. Available on 97–99 FM and on digital platforms.
{|
|valign="top"|Slogan:||We are the 1
|}
BBC Radio 1 Dance – a dance music-oriented 'stream' consisting of repeated and simulcast programming from Radio 1. Available only on BBC Sounds.

BBC Radio 1 Relax – a chillout music and mindfulness-orientated 'stream' consisting of repeated and simulcast programming from Radio 1 and 1Xtra, available only on BBC Sounds.

BBC Radio 1Xtra – new black and urban music, plus news, original in-house live music sessions, original live music concerts and music documentaries. The service simulcasts Radio 1 from 01:00 to 03:00 weekdays and from 19:00 to 01:00 on Saturdays.
{|
|valign="top" |Slogan:||Amplifying Black Music and Culture 
|}
BBC Radio 2 – adult-orientated music, along with talk, comedy and alternative music, plus news, original in-house live music sessions, original live music concerts and music documentaries. Available on 88–91 FM and on digital platforms.
{|
|valign="top"|Slogan:||The World's biggest stars on the UK's most listened to radio station / This is Radio 2, on the BBC Sounds app, on your smart speaker and on 88 to 91 FM (intro to the news bulletins) 
|}
BBC Radio 3 – arts and high culture, special-interest music (classical, jazz, world music), plus news, original in-house live music sessions, original live music concerts and music documentaries. Available on 90–93 FM and digital platforms.
{|
|valign="top"|Slogan:||Classical, Jazz, World Music, Drama, Documentaries, Features… and light in the Darkness
|}
BBC Radio 4 – news, current affairs, arts, history, original in-house drama, original in-house first-run comedy, science, books and religious programming. The service closes down and simulcasts the BBC World Service from 01:00 to 05:20 daily. Available between 92–95 and 103–105 FM, 198 LW, various medium wave frequencies and on digital platforms.
{|
|valign="top"|Slogan:||Your Audio Friend – Documentaries, News, Comedy and Drama
|}
BBC Radio 4 Extra – classic comedy, drama, books, science fiction, fantasy and children's programmes. Originally named BBC Radio 7.
{|
|valign="top"|Slogan:||Comedy, Drama and more from BBC Radio 4
|}
BBC Radio 5 Live – news, sports and talk programmes, available on 693 and 909 kHz MW and digital frequencies. Also simulcast on BBC local radio station frequencies during overnight hours. Launched in 1994 as a replacement for the original Radio 5.
{|
|valign="top"|Slogan:||The voice of the UK 
|}
BBC Radio 5 Sports Extra – a sister station to Radio 5 Live for additional coverage of sporting events.
{|
|valign="top"|Slogan:||More live sport. Pure live sport.
|}
BBC Radio 6 Music – an eclectic mix of alternative genres including rock, funk, punk and reggae (and most non-special interest genres), plus news, original in-house live music sessions, original live music concerts and music documentaries
{|
|valign="top"|Slogan:||The best music beyond the mainstream
|}
BBC Asian Network – aimed at the large South Asian community in the UK (primarily a digital radio station, but available in parts of the Midlands on medium wave)
{|
|valign="top"|Slogan:||Celebrating British Asian life, culture and music
|}

Nations, regions and local stations
The BBC also operates radio stations for three UK nations: Wales, Scotland, and Northern Ireland. These stations focus on local issues to a greater extent than their UK-wide counterparts, organising live phone-in debates about these issues, as well as lighter talk shows with music from different decades of the 20th and 21st centuries. Compared to the majority of the UK's commercially funded radio stations, which generally broadcast little beyond contemporary popular music, the BBC's "national regional" stations offer a more diverse range of programming.

BBC Radio Wales: A variety of programming in Wales.
BBC Radio Cymru: Programming in Welsh language, with opt-out station BBC Radio Cymru 2.
BBC Radio Scotland: A variety of programming in Scotland, with its Orkney and Shetland opt-outs.
BBC Radio nan Gàidheal: Programming in Scottish Gaelic language.
BBC Radio Ulster: A variety of programming in Northern Ireland, with opt-out station BBC Radio Foyle.

Local services
There are forty BBC Local Radio services across England and the Channel Islands, often catering to individual counties, cities, or wider regions.

World Service
BBC World Service is the world's largest international broadcaster, broadcasting in 27 languages to many parts of the world via analogue and digital shortwave, internet streaming and podcasting, satellite, FM and MW relays. It is politically independent (by mandate of the Agreement providing details of the topics outlined in the BBC Charter), non-profit, and commercial-free. The English language service had always had a UK listenership on LW and therefore DAB Services allowed, by this popular demand, it to be now available 24/7 for this audience in better quality reception.

Broadcasting
BBC Radio services are broadcast on various FM and AM frequencies, DAB digital radio and live streaming on BBC Online, which is available worldwide.

They are also available on digital television in the UK, and archived programs are available for seven days after broadcast on the BBC website; many shows are available as podcasts.

International syndication
The BBC also syndicates radio and podcast content to radio stations and other broadcasting services around the globe, through its BBC Radio International business, which is part of BBC Studios. Programmes regularly syndicated by BBC Radio International include: In Concert (live rock music recordings from BBC Radio 1 and BBC Radio 2, including an archive dating back to 1971); interviews, live sessions and music shows; classical music (including performances from the BBC Proms); spoken word (music documentaries, dramas, readings, features and comedies, mainly from BBC Radio 4) and channels, including BBC Radio 1.

BBC Radio International also provides many services internationally including in-flight entertainment, subscription, and satellite services. BBC Radio International is partnered with Sirius Satellite Radio and British Airways as well as many other local radio stations.

Programmes

Throughout its history the BBC has produced many radio programmes. Particularly significant, influential, popular or long-lasting programmes include:
Any Questions? (1948–present): Topical debate series.
The Archers (1950–present): Long running rural soap opera. Currently the most listened to programme on Radio 4 and on the BBC's online radio service.
Children's Hour (1922–1964): Long running slot for children's programmes.
Desert Island Discs (1942–present): Interview programme in which the guest chooses the eight pieces of music they would take with them to a desert island. The longest running music radio programme in British history.
Friday Night Is Music Night (1953–present): Long running live music show, covering a wide range of music tastes.
Gardeners' Question Time (1947–present): Gardening programme in which gardening experts give advice and answer listeners' questions.
The Goon Show (1951–1960): Highly influential comedy series with elements of surrealism.
Hancock's Half Hour (1954–1960): Influential comedy series which transferred to television.
The Hitchhiker's Guide to the Galaxy (1978–1980 and 2004–2005): Comedy science fiction serial by Douglas Adams.
I'm Sorry I Haven't a Clue (1972–present): Comedy series parodying the radio panel game format.
It's That Man Again (1939–1949): Comedy series popular during and after World War II.
Journey into Space (1953–1958): Science fiction series which was the last UK radio programme to achieve a higher audience than television.
Just a Minute (1967–present): Long running panel game where the contestants must attempt to speak for one minute without repetition, hesitation or deviation.
Letter from America (1946–2004): Commentary on American news and events by Alistair Cooke. The longest-running speech radio programme in history.
The News Quiz (1977–present): Topical comedy show
The Reith Lectures (1948–present): Annual series of lectures given by leading figures of the day.
Round the Horne (1965–1968): Comedy series notable for its innuendo and use of the gay slang polari.
Sports Report (1948–present): Saturday sports round-up including the classified football results.
Test Match Special (1957–present): Live cricket coverage.
Today programme (1957–present): Early morning news and current affairs programme.
Top Gear/The John Peel Show (1965–2004): Pioneering and influential alternative music programme. Originally fronted by Brian Matthew as a live music show, which featured unique performances by many top names such as The Beatles, The Who and Jimi Hendrix. Changed name to simply The John Peel Show in the early 1970s
Woman's Hour (1946–present): Long running magazine programme for women.
Workers' Playtime (1941–1964): Lunchtime variety show.
The World at One (1965–present): Lunchtime news show.

Expenditure
The following expenditure figures are from 2012/13 and show the expenditure of each service they are obliged to provide:

Directors

See also

BBC Radio Drama Company
BBC Radio Drama
BBC Television, BBC domestic television services.
British Broadcasting Company
Timeline of the BBC, for an overview of BBC history.
List of BBC Radio programmes adapted for television
NPR, the closest American correspondent.
CBC Radio, the Canadian correspondent.
List of songs banned by the BBC

References

Further reading

External links

 
Radio broadcasting companies of the United Kingdom
Internet radio in the United Kingdom
Radio
Peabody Award winners
Radio during World War II
Radio stations established in 1927
Entertainment companies established in 1927
1927 establishments in England
British companies established in 1927